"I'll Wait" is a song by American rock band Van Halen, taken from their sixth studio album, 1984 (1984). The song was written by band members Eddie Van Halen, Alex Van Halen, Michael Anthony and David Lee Roth, along with Michael McDonald and produced by Ted Templeman.

It was the second single released from the record and reached number 13 on the Billboard Hot 100. Despite the song being a hit, no video was ever filmed for it.

Writing and composition
The song was written as a collaboration between Van Halen and Doobie Brothers singer Michael McDonald, who was brought in by Templeman when David Lee Roth had trouble completing the melody and lyrics to the song. The song is in the key of D minor, having a moderate common time tempo of 114 beats per minute.

Like "Jump," the song features keyboards almost entirely, including a synthesizer bass line, and also features heavy use of Alex Van Halen's Rototom drum kit.

The song's subject was inspired by a woman wearing men's underwear in a Calvin Klein print media advertisement. Roth pinned up the ad beside his Sony Trinitron television and addressed the lyrics to the model.

The single's original cover featured the band posing in the same location where the cover for the "Hot for Teacher" single had been shot.

David Lee Roth and producer Ted Templeman wanted to remove the song from the album, while Eddie Van Halen and engineer Donn Landee pushed for its inclusion.

Reception
Cash Box said that "this mid-tempo solid rocker is sure to catch the ear of both heavy metal and pop fans" and that "lead guitarist Eddie Van Halen sculpts some masterful backing riffs, and also creates a thoughtful and tasty guitar solo."

Chuck Klosterman of Vulture.com ranked it the 43rd-best Van Halen song, noting its "mammoth drums, mammoth synth, not much verve or panache."

Track listing
US 7" single

UK 7" single/US 12" single

Personnel
David Lee Roth – lead vocals
Eddie Van Halen – guitar, keyboards
Alex Van Halen – drums
Michael Anthony – keyboard bass, backing vocals

Charts

References

Further reading

1984 singles
1984 songs
Van Halen songs
Songs written by Michael McDonald (musician)
Songs written by Michael Anthony (musician)
Songs written by David Lee Roth
Songs written by Alex Van Halen
Songs written by Eddie Van Halen
Song recordings produced by Ted Templeman
Warner Records singles
Synth rock songs